Chiricahua is a genus of geometrid moths in the family Geometridae. There are at least two described species in Chiricahua.

Species
These two species belong to the genus Chiricahua:
 Chiricahua lichenaria Ferris, 2010 i g
 Chiricahua multidentata (Guedet, 1941) i g b
Data sources: i = ITIS, c = Catalogue of Life, g = GBIF, b = Bugguide.net

References

Further reading

 
 
 
 

Nacophorini
Articles created by Qbugbot